Edner Cherry (born July 21, 1982) is a Bahamian professional boxer and two-time world title challenger.

Early years
Cherry was born to a Bahamian father and a Haitian mother. He emigrated from The Bahamas to the United States, and resides in Wauchula, Florida.

Career
Cherry began boxing professionally in 2001, with mixed results (3-2-2 as of July 2002). Soon after signing with Peter Fernandez and Starfight Productions he appeared to find his groove, racking up 14 straight wins and acquiring a number of minor titles—the WBC Caribbean Boxing Federation Lightweight title and the NBA Intercontinental Lightweight Title.  Cherry then lost an IBF title eliminator to Ricky Quiles by split decision to end his win streak. In February 2007 Cherry lost a unanimous decision to Paulie Malignaggi on HBO.

Recently, Edner Cherry has been named Friday Night Fights Boxer of the Year (2006) by ESPN  and has fought on both Showtime and HBO.

In 2008, Cherry knocked out former WBC Lightweight champion Stevie Johnston in the 10th round. Cherry's 'Cherry Bomb' left hook had Johnston down in the third and the ninth, and a straight right hand put away the former champion for the count at 2:34 in the tenth round of a WBC USNBC national title bout. Following that fight, Cherry wound up fighting WBC light welterweight champion Timothy Bradley for the belt. Although very well prepared for this fight, Cherry dropped a unanimous decision to Bradley.

At the end of 2008, Cherry left his long-time trainer, Pete Fernandez and signed with TKO Promotions. Under TKO, Cherry has won three straight fights, all by stoppage. Cherry was scheduled to fight for the NABO super featherweight title, but after the original opponent pulled out of the fight, his management was unable to find a replacement. The fight was cancelled.

Cherry has also won the NABA and NABF lightweight titles.

In January 2012, Cherry signed a promotional deal with Chicago-based, 8 Count Promotions.  He also signed an exclusive management deal with Albert Falcon and Patrick Doljanin of Warehouse Boxing, located in Highland Park, IL.

Professional boxing record

References

External links
 
Shotime's Edner Cherry Bio
Article about Edner Cherry
Interview With Edner Cherry before 2nd bout with Wes Ferguson
Cherry vs. Meza-Clay

1982 births
Living people
Bahamian emigrants to the United States
Bahamian people of Haitian descent
Sportspeople from Nassau, Bahamas
Bahamian male boxers
American male boxers
People from Wauchula, Florida
Super-featherweight boxers
Light-welterweight boxers
Lightweight boxers